Beavercreek is the largest city in Greene County, Ohio, United States, and is the second-largest suburb of Dayton. The population was 46,549 at the 2020 census. It is part of Metro Dayton. The Beavercreek area was settled in the early 1800s. A part of Beavercreek Township was incorporated and became the City of Beavercreek in February 1980.

Many Beavercreek residents work at nearby Wright-Patterson Air Force Base. In terms of number of residents in an incorporated area, Beavercreek is third in the region behind Dayton and Kettering. The city features two golf courses and two shopping malls. In 2007, Beavercreek ranked 84th in Money's Top 100 places to live.

Geography
Beavercreek is at  (39.729359, -84.062310), approximately five miles east of downtown Dayton.

Beavercreek includes the former unincorporated communities of Alpha, Knollwood, most of New Germany, and Zimmerman.

Demographics

2010 census
As of the census of 2010, there were 45,193 people, 18,195 households, and 12,542 families residing in the city. The racial makeup of the city was 88.5% White, 2.5% African American, 0.2% Native American, 5.9% Asian, 0.5% from other races, and 2.3% from two or more races. Hispanic or Latino of any race were 2.6% of the population.

There were 18,195 households, of which 30.0% had children under the age of 18 living with them, 58.9% were married couples living together, 6.8% had a female householder with no husband present, 3.2% had a male householder with no wife present, and 31.1% were non-families. 24.9% of all households were made up of individuals, and 8% had someone living alone who was 65 years of age or older. The average household size was 2.47 and the average family size was 2.98.

The median age in the city was 40.4 years. 22.6% of residents were under the age of 18; 8.5% were between the ages of 18 and 24; 24.8% were from 25 to 44; 29.6% were from 45 to 64; and 14.3% were 65 years of age or older. The gender makeup of the city was 49.9% male and 50.1% female.

2000 census
As of the census of 2000, there were 37,984 people, 14,071 households, and 11,087 families residing in the city. The population density was 1,439.2 people per square mile (555.7/km2). There were 14,769 housing units at an average density of 559.6/sq mi (216.1/km2). The racial makeup of the city was 93.45% White, 1.42% African American, 0.17% Native American, 3.50% Asian, 0.02% Pacific Islander, 0.31% from other races, and 1.13% from two or more races. Hispanic or Latino of any race were 1.14% of the population.

There were 14,071 households, out of which 35.2% had children under the age of 18 living with them, 70.7% were married couples living together, 5.8% had a female householder with no husband present, and 21.2% were non-families. 17.5% of all households were made up of individuals, and 5.7% had someone living alone who was 65 years of age or older. The average household size was 2.66 and the average family size was 3.02.

In the city the population was spread out, with 25.3% under the age of 18, 6.3% from 18 to 24, 26.9% from 25 to 44, 29.3% from 45 to 64, and 12.2% who were 65 years of age or older. The median age was 40 years. For every 100 females, there were 97.7 males. For every 100 females age 18 and over, there were 95.7 males.

The median income for a household in the city was $68,801, and the median income for a family was $75,965.  Males had a median income of $55,270 versus $33,572 for females. The per capita income for the city was $48,298. About 1.5% of families and 2.4% of the population were below the poverty line, including 1.9% of those under age 18 and 3.7% of those age 65 or over.

Local government
Beavercreek is governed by six City Council members, elected at large with rotating terms every four years and a directly elected Mayor.  The Council member receiving the most votes in the most recent election will serve as Vice Mayor.  Council members are elected in odd number years for terms beginning in even numbered years. Beginning in November 2019, the office of Mayor was directly elected. Bob Stone became the first directly elected Mayor for the City of Beavercreek. The Mayor's duties primarily entails responsibility for presiding at City Council meetings, representing the City at local events, and other ceremonial duties.  Mayor Bob Stone was originally elected (received highest votes) in November 2015 for a term starting January 2016, re-elected (received highest votes) in November 2017 to continue as Mayor starting in January 2018 and then elected in November 2019 as the City's first directly elected Mayor for a four-year term starting January 2020.  City Council members and the Mayor are limited to two consecutive four year terms serving any combination of City Council member and or Mayor.  A City Council member in the middle of their second term (6 years) if elected as Mayor, can serve the full four year term, thus actually serving a total of 10 years.

City Council Members and term start years:
 Mayor Chloe Humphrey (2020) – Mayor of Beavercreek since 2016
Vice Mayor Don Adams (2020) - Vice Mayor of Beavercreek (2020-2021)
 Councilwoman Joanna Garcia (2018) – Served as Vice Mayor of Beavercreek from (2018-2019)
 Councilman Charles Curran (2020)
Councilman Pete Bales (2020)
 Councilwoman Tiffany Swartz (2020)*
 Councilman Glen Duerr (2020)**

*Councilwoman Tiffany Swartz was appointed in 2020 to an unexpired term (2018)

**Councilman Glen Duerr was appointed in 2020 to an unexpired term (2018)

The City Manager is appointed by the City Council and serves as the chief administrative officer of the City according to the city's Charter.  The City Manager provides for the overall management direction and oversight of the City organization and is responsible for its efficient and effective operation in accordance with the policies, programs and regulations established by the City Council.  The City Manager is also responsible for initiating proposals and providing advice, information and research to the City Council concerning the formulation of municipal policies, practices and projects.  The current City Manager is Pete E. Landrum.

The City of Beavercreek has a public-access television cable TV channel, on which all public meetings can be seen live and are rerun later.  The public access channel can be viewed live on the City's website at http://www.beavercreekohio.gov/172/Live-Broadcast. Planning Commission meetings are held on the first Wednesday of every month. City Council meetings are normally held on the second and fourth Mondays of every month (with exceptions for holidays and the fourth Monday in December).  The third Monday of each month (except December) is a City Council work session.

Education
Beavercreek City School District consists of 6 elementary schools, 2 middle schools, a separate ninth grade campus, and 1 high school. Beavercreek has a public library, a branch of the Greene County Public Library.

Recreation
The Beavercreek City Parks department operates and maintains 23 parks and other properties.

Beavercreek Station is a hub along Creekside Trail, a bike path that stretches from Xenia to Eastwood MetroPark in Dayton. The path stretches over 15 miles and has a number of hubs and connecting trails. Amenities include year-round restroom facilities and a bike-fix station.

Notable people
General Janet C. Wolfenbarger, former Commander, Air Force Materiel Command and the first female four-star general of the United States Air Force is from Beavercreek and is a 1976 graduate of Beavercreek High School. Taylor Ewert, 2020 graduate of Beavercreek High School, was named Gatorade National Girls Track and Field Athlete of the Year in 2020. Aftab Pureval, 2001 graduate of Beavercreek High School, became the 70th mayor of Cincinnati in January 2022 becoming the city's first mayor of Asian descent.

References

External links
 City website

 
Cities in Ohio
Cities in Greene County, Ohio
Populated places established in 1980
1980 establishments in Ohio